A hidden camera or spy camera is a camera used to photograph or record subjects, often people, without their knowledge. The camera may be considered "hidden" because it is not visible to the subject being filmed, or is disguised as another object. Hidden cameras are often considered a surveillance tool.

The term “hidden camera” is commonly used when subjects are unaware that they are being recorded, usually lacking their knowledge and consent; the term “spy camera” is generally used when the subject would object to being recorded if they were aware of the camera's presence. In contrast, the phrase "security camera" refers to cameras that are visible and/or are accompanied by a warning notice of their presence, so the subject is aware of the camera's presence and knows they are being filmed.

The use of hidden cameras raises personal privacy issues. There may be legal aspects to consider, depending on the jurisdiction in which they are used.

Description
A hidden camera can be wired or wireless. Hidden cameras connected, by cable or wirelessly, to a viewing or recording device, such as a television, computer, videocassette recorder, network video recorder, digital video recorder, memory card, or another data storage medium. They may also store their images or recordings online, such as through a livestream. Hidden video cameras may or may not have audio recording capabilities. Hidden cameras may be activated manually, remotely, or through motion detection.

A hidden camera may not be visible to the subject, for example, because it is fitted with a long-focus lens and located beyond the view of the subject, or because it is obscured or hidden by an object, such as a one-way mirror. Hidden cameras can be built into a wide variety of items, ranging from electronics (television sets, smoke detectors, clocks, motion detectors, mobile phones, personal computers) to everyday objects where electronics are not expected to be found (stationery, plants, glasses, clothing, street lights).

Use 
Common applications for hidden cameras are property security, personal surveillance, photography, or entertainment purposes, though they may also be used for espionage or surveillance by law enforcement, intelligence agencies, corporations, or other entities. They may also be used for illegal activity, such as criminal scope-outs, stalking, or voyeurism.

Hidden cameras may be installed within common household objects for parents to monitor and record the activities of nannies and sometimes the children themselves. These hidden cameras are commonly referred to as "nanny cams". The use nanny cams can be a subject of controversy. For example, a 2003 criminal case in Florida, involving a nanny that was allegedly caught by a nanny cam violently shaking a baby, was thrown out in 2006 when the video was considered "worthless evidence"; however, this was due to issues regarding video quality, not legality, and several earlier cases used clearer nanny cam footage as evidence. Some hidden camera television shows have also led to lawsuits or the cancellation of episodes by the people who were trapped in set-ups that they found unpleasant.

In media

Hidden cameras are sometimes used in reality television and social media, where they are used to catch participants in unusual or absurd situations. Participants will either know they will be filmed, but not always exactly when or where; or they will not know they have been filmed until later, at which point they may sign a release or give consent to the footage being produced for a show. This latter subgenre of unwitting participants began in the 1940s with Allen Funt's Candid Microphone theatrical short films. In 1996 the genre was given an overhaul by Travis Draft who introduced the glasses cam with his show Buzzkill. The show took a hidden camera to a whole new level where the performer was the focal point.

Legal issues

South Korea 

In South Korea, hidden cameras (abbreviated to Molka in Korean) proliferated in the 2010s and enabled the spread of voyeuristic images and videos. The term Molka can refer to both the actual cameras as well as the footage posted online.

United Kingdom 
The use of hidden cameras is generally permitted under UK law, if used in a legal manner and towards legitimate ends. Individuals may use covert surveillance in their own home to spy on others, in the workplace for employee monitoring, outside of a domestic or commercial property for security purposes, and in most security situations where there is a just need to do so. There are a number of laws under the Data Protection Act and Human Rights Acts that may affect the use of hidden cameras.

In any type of covert surveillance, footage should only be used for the purpose for which it has been taken, which must be a legitimate security reason. The person in possession of the footage is responsible for its use, and must only retain footage for as long as it is reasonably needed. It is not permitted to release the footage to third parties except when there is a legal necessity.

It is illegal under UK law to deploy covert cameras in areas where individuals would have an expectation of privacy, such as bathrooms, changing rooms, and locker rooms. It is also illegal to place hidden cameras in someone else's home or on someone else's property.

United States 
In the United States, the purchase, ownership, and use of hidden cameras and nanny cams is generally considered legal in all 50 states. However, U.S. Code Title 18, Chapter 119, Section 2512 prohibits the interception of oral communication by "surreptitious manner" such as a hidden recording device, and so most hidden video cameras are not available with audio recording. Additionally, it is illegal in 13 states to record audio without express or written consent of the nanny being recorded. Despite this, some hidden cameras are still sold in the United States with audio recording capabilities, though their use is illegal and their recordings cannot legally be used as evidence.

See also

 Secret photography
 Closed-circuit television
 Dashcam
 Video door-phone

References

External links 
 

 
Cameras
Recording
Television genres